The 1972 All-Ireland Senior Club Camogie Championship for the leading clubs in the women's team field sport of camogie was won for the second year in succession by Austin Stacks (Du), who defeated Portglenone (Ant) in the final, played at Croke Park.

Arrangements
The championship was organised on the traditional provincial system used in Gaelic Games since the 1880s, with Oranmore and Ahane winning the championships of the other two provinces. Dublin champions Austin Stacks could call on with seven interprovincial players and were strengthened by the arrival of Liz Neary, who had already won three All- Ireland Club medals with St Paul’s, and the return of Sligo-born Mary Sherlock, holder of five All-Ireland senior medals. It was goalkeeper Sheila Murray who was player of the match in the semi-final victory over Oranmore, saving a wide variety of shots including a goal-bound 15-yard free. Portglenone were led by their All-Ireland star, Mairéad McAtamney, Sue McLarnon, Teresa McAtamney and Brigid Graham in their 11-point victory over Ahane, who had held a cake sale to help defray the cost of the journey.

The Final
Anne Sheehy, Mary Ryan, Lucy McEvoy, Bríd Keenan and Vera Sullivan were key figures in Stacks’ win in the final.

Final stages

References

External links
 Camogie Association

1972 in camogie
1972
Cam